Oscar Novoa (born 1886, date of death unknown) was a Chilean fencer. He competed in the team sabre event at the 1928 Summer Olympics.

References

1886 births
Year of death missing
Chilean male sabre fencers
Olympic fencers of Chile
Fencers at the 1928 Summer Olympics